1989–90 Svenska Cupen was the 35th season of the main Swedish football Cup. The competition started in 1989 and concluded in 1990 with the Final, held at Råsunda Stadium, Solna Municipality in Stockholms län. Djurgårdens IF won the final 3-0 against BK Häcken.

References

Svenska Cupen seasons
Cupen
Cupen
Sweden